Sod's Law is the sixth studio album by Spear of Destiny, released by Burning Rome Records in 1992 (see 1992 in music) and subsequently re-issued by Snapper Music in 1997.

Track listing (1997 reissue)
All songs written by Kirk Brandon

 "Goldmine" - 3:55
 "Into The Rising Sun" - 4:04
 "Black Country Girl" - 4:30
 "Bull Comes Down" - 4:12
 "Slow Me Down" - 4:58
 "Taking Care Of Business" - 4:50
 "In The City" - 4:20
 "Babylon Talking" - 4:59
 "Crystalize" - 4:35
 "Captain America" - 3:45
 "Chemical Head" (Bonus)
 "Paradise" (Bonus)
 "Burn Out" (Bonus)

Personnel
Spear of Destiny
Kirk Brandon - Vocals and guitar
Mark Gemini Thwaite - Lead and rhythm guitar, bass guitar
Pete Barnacle - Drums and percussion
John "Boy" Lennard - Saxophone
Stan Stammers - Bass guitar
with:
Fiona Barrow - Violin on 2, 5, 7
Volker Janssen - Keyboards on 4

References
Sod's Law - BRR LP 011 (1992)
Sod's Law - BRR MC 011 (1992)
Sod's Law - BRR CD 011 (1992)
Sod's Law - SMM CD 512 (1997)

1991 albums
Spear of Destiny (band) albums